Bitterfontein is a village in the Knersvlakte, the northernmost area of the Western Cape province of South Africa,  north of Cape Town. It is the railhead of a line from Cape Town; ore from the copper mines at Okiep is transferred there from road transport to the railway.

Bitterfontein is located in the Matzikama Local Municipality, which is part of the West Coast District Municipality. It is served by a police station, a primary school, a library, and a satellite health clinic.

Trivia
 The South African country singer Ruben Lennox wrote a song about Bitterfontein

References

Populated places in the Matzikama Local Municipality